Gradiz is a former freguesia in Aguiar da Beira Municipality, Guarda District, Portugal. It was merged with Sequeiros in 2013 to form the new freguesia Sequeiros e Gradiz.

Demography

References 

Former parishes of Aguiar da Beira